William H. Nelson is an American businessman who is the former CEO of Intermountain Health Care. He received his B.S. in accounting from the Marriott School of Management, Brigham Young University, in 1967. He was also the first recipient of the National Healthcare Leadership Award.

William H. Nelson served as the president and chief executive officer of Intermountain Healthcare, an integrated nonprofit healthcare system with 160 healthcare facilities, including hospitals, clinics and an insurance organization, from 1999 until his retirement in early 2009.
Nationally acclaimed Intermountain Healthcare is the largest healthcare provider in the intermountain west, with over 33,000 employees serving the needs of Utah and southeastern Idaho residents. Nelson also served as the chief operating officer of Intermountain Healthcare from 1995 to 1998 and as the chief financial officer from 1976 to 1995. He has served on the boards of the Utah Symphony & Opera, Beneficial Life Insurance, United Way of the Greater Salt Lake Area and the Healthcare Research and Development Institute. Nelson received his Bachelor of Science in Accounting from Brigham Young University and his MBA from the University of Southern California.

Nelson is a somewhat accidental health-system executive. He was born in Cedar City, raised in California, where surfing was a daily delight, and attended Brigham Young University, where he met his wife-to-be, Christine Miles. He earned his degree in accounting, then did graduate work at the University of Southern California, before serving an LDS Church mission to Italy. He also earned an MBA.

He became an accountant at Ernst & Ernst in Los Angeles, grabbed from the bullpen to do whatever needed to be done until one of the partners decided it might be a good idea to form a group that would deal exclusively with health care, which is complicated. He joined that team "because I liked the other people" who were part of it.

Four years later, Nelson started working on the accounts of The Church of Jesus Christ of Latter-day Saints, which was getting ready to divest itself of hospitals in Utah and Idaho. Nelson was assigned to the divestiture and moved to the accounting firm's Salt Lake office in 1974, where he worked closely with representatives from the church.

When the newly formed Intermountain Health Care (it has since changed the name to make Healthcare one word) needed a chief financial officer, he applied. And that began a long career with Intermountain that would take the young man, 29 when he came on board, to the pinnacle of the organization.

Were he keeping score, he says, his career has had more high points than lows. He's received prestigious awards and Intermountain has been honored a number of times as an example of a well-run health-care system. Among his favorite honors is a national study that says if the care and cost in three areas — Rochester, N.Y.; Salt Lake City and Portland, Ore. — could be replicated nationwide, Americans would save $35 billion and the outcomes for patients would be significantly better.

After retiring from Intermountain Healthcare in 2009, Nelson served as a mission president over the New York New York South Mission of the Church of Jesus Christ of Latter-Day Saints from 2009 to 2012.

References 

Marriott School of Management alumni
American health care businesspeople
Living people
1944 births